Acacia olgana, commonly known as Kata Tjuta wattle or Mount Olga wattle, is a shrub or tree in the genus Acacia that is found in central Australia.

Description
It has rough, slightly fissured bark that is grey or grey-brown in colour with angular branches that are light brown to reddish in colour and mostly glabrous. The evergreen phyllodes sometimes have reddish margins.

Taxonomy
The species was first formally described by the botanist John Maconochie in 1978 as part of the work Notes on the genus Acacia in the Northern Territory as published in the Journal of the Adelaide Botanic Gardens. It was later reclassified as Racosperma olganum by Leslie Pedley in 1986 but transferred back to the genus Acacia in 2006.

Distribution
A. olgana has a scattered distribution from the far east of central Western Australia in the Goldfields region into the south of the Northern Territory and north western South Australia.

See also
List of Acacia species

References

olgana
Shrubs
Fabales of Australia
Flora of the Northern Territory
Plants described in 1978
Acacias of Western Australia
Flora of South Australia